Uncial 0302 (in the Gregory-Aland numbering), is a Greek-Coptic uncial manuscript of the New Testament. Palaeographically it has been assigned to the 6th century.

Description 

The codex contains two small parts of the Gospel of John 10:29-30, on one parchment fragment (7.5 cm by 3.7 cm). It is written in one column per page, 5 lines per page (on survived fragment only), in uncial letters. 

The Greek text of this codex is too brief to determine its textual character. 

Currently it is dated by the INTF to the 6th century.

Location 
Currently the codex is housed at the Berlin State Museums (P. 21315) in Berlin.

See also 

 List of New Testament uncials
 Biblical manuscripts
 Textual criticism

References

Further reading 

  

Greek New Testament uncials
6th-century biblical manuscripts
Greek-Coptic diglot manuscripts of the New Testament